Roderick David (born 26 August 1963) is a former Australian-born Singaporean cricketer who played for Singapore national cricket team. He was included in the Singapore team for the 1997 ICC Trophy.

Playing career 
During the 1997 ICC Trophy, he contributed for the team with a match winning bowling figures of 3 for 19 in a match against Malaysia. He finished that tournament with 4 wickets at a bowling average of 29.75.

Personal life 
David moved to Singapore from Australia in the 1990s where he worked as an engineer. David senior  moved back to Australia in the wake of the Asian Financial Crisis in 1997, when son Tim was two years old. Tim grew up in Perth and is also a cricketer.

References

External links
 .

1963 births
Living people
Cricketers from New South Wales
Singaporean cricketers